Count Agenor Romuald Gołuchowski (8 February 1812, Skala-Podilska, Galicia – 3 August 1875, Lwów, Galicia) was a Polish-Austrian conservative politician, member of parliament of Austria, Minister of Interior and governor of Galicia, and father of Agenor Maria Gołuchowski and Adam Gołuchowski. Gołuchowski was a confidant and key advisor to the Emperor Franz Joseph.

He was the author of the 1860 October Diploma, which ended the era of absolutism in Austrian Empire.

George Walter Prothero writes that Gołuchowski was instrumental in ensuring "steady support of the monarchy" among the upper classes of Galicia:
He was himself a Pole, though a strong opponent of revolution. He had clear aims for the economic improvement of Galicia, which he believed could only be attained by banishing distrust of the Poles from the mind of the Government. He realized also that this could be best accomplished by creating a party in Galicia upon whose loyalty the dynasty could rely.

References 

1812 births
1875 deaths
People from Ternopil Oblast
People from the Kingdom of Galicia and Lodomeria
Counts of Austria
Counts of Poland
Austrian people of Polish descent
Ruthenian nobility
Governors of the Kingdom of Galicia and Lodomeria
Members of the Diet of Galicia and Lodomeria